Chips is a historic coffee shop in Los Angeles, California. It is an example of the Googie Architecture style of Modern Architecture. It was designed by Harry Harrison (architect). It features a jutting roof, large glass windows, tropical plants and a steel-beam pylon sign and is located at 11908 Hawthorne Boulevard (California).

References

Googie architecture in California
Restaurants in Los Angeles